Doriane Tahane (born October 14, 1989 in Nogent-sur-Marne, France) is a French basketball player who plays for club Nantes Reze of the League feminine de basket the top league of basketball for women in France.

References

French women's basketball players
1989 births
Living people
Sportspeople from Nogent-sur-Marne